Wolver Hollow (1964–1987) was a British-bred Thoroughbred racehorse and stallion. In a career spanning four seasons, his performances in handicaps and top class company, including victory in the 1969 Eclipse Stakes, established him as a talented racehorse without being exceptional. He would achieve greater success as a stallion whereupon retiring to stud where he became Champion Sire in Britain.

Background

By Sovereign Path and out of Cygnet, Wolver Hollow was sold as a yearling, fetching 4,000 guineas Sovereign Path, rated 125 by Timeform, was successful in the 1959 Tetrarch Stakes as well as the 1960 renewals of the Lockinge Stakes and Queen Elizabeth II Stakes. As a sire, he produced sixteen crops of racehorses, the most notable of which was Humble Duty. Nevertheless, he also counted multiple big race winners among his progeny including Town Crier (Queen Anne Stakes), Supreme Sovereign (Lockinge Stakes) and Spanish Express (Middle Park Stakes). While Wolver Hollow's dam Cygnet, by undefeated champion racehorse Caracalla, did not hail from an immediately prolific family, her third dam, Sunshot, was the granddam of classic winners Resplendent (1926 Irish Oaks and dam of Windsor Lad) and Sol Speranza who won the same two classics in 1937. Alongside Wolver Hollow, Cygnet produced nine other foals including Gaybrook Swan, second in the 1970 Niagara Handicap and Tall Dream, runner up in both the National Stakes and Beresford Stakes of 1971.

Racing career

1966: two-year-old season
Wolver Hollow made his debut in the 1966 New Stakes, now known as the Norfolk Stakes, at Ascot where he finished four lengths behind the Johnson Houghton trained Falcon. On his second start, he finished behind Falcon again when fourth in the National Stakes at Sandown - a course incidentally where Falcon would win the following season's Temple Stakes. Wolver Hollow would then be unplaced at Kempton before rounding off the season finishing fourth of thirteen starters in the Dewhurst Stakes behind the next season's English and Irish Derby third Dart Board.

1967: three-year-old season
Newbury would be Wolver Hollow's first port of call in 1967 where he would contest the Greenham Stakes, a traditional trial for the 2000 Guineas. Finishing third by a neck and a head, this was the closest he had come to shedding his maiden tag. However, it was not the strongest Guineas trial given that neither of the front two were entered for the classic. While it transpired to be useful form, (the runner up, Reform, would become the leading miler of the season), Wolver Hollow started at an unfancied 40/1 when finishing unplaced on his next start in the Guineas. Returning to the Royal Ascot meeting where he made his debut the previous year, Wolver Hollow again ran into Reform finishing just under a length and a half fourth in the St James's Palace Stakes. At the Goodwood meeting, Wolver Hollow entered handicap company with a reasonable fifth under second top-weight, giving a pound to Irish Derby runner up Sucaryl and six pounds to Falmouth Stakes winner Resilience. A step down in class a month later facilitated Wolver Hollow finally losing his maiden tag as he won the ten furlong Virginia Stakes at Newcastle. While the contest was effectively a maiden race, Wolver Hollow only had to be shaken up to win by four lengths. Little over a week later, Wolver Hollow doubled his tally with success in the one mile Crathorne Sweepstakes at York. There he faced three rivals;- Worthy Friend, a long priced outsider, Derby also-ran Scottish Sinbad who won a handicap at the same Newcastle meeting where Wolver Hollow was victorious, and Queen Anne Stakes runner up Arenaria who was in receipt of ten pounds. Scottish Sinbad made the running but was closely tracked by Wolver Hollow under a motionless Edward Hide who sent his mount home inside the final furlong to win by a length and a half with Arenaria a further two lengths behind. After the race, he was given a 25/1 quote for the Cambridgeshire Handicap. In preparation for the Cambridgeshire, Wolver Hollow contested the Wavertree Stakes at Newmarket but was unable to complete a hat-trick, finishing a length and three quarters behind easy Nassau Stakes winner Fair Winter. Wolver Hollow capped off his season with a two and a half length third in the Cambridgeshire off 8st 12lb behind Irish 1,000 Guineas winner Lacquer

1968: four-year-old season
Wolver Hollow made four racecourse appearances in 1968 although the first was not until August when he participated in two races at the Deauville summer festival. The first appearance came when fourth in the Prix Gontaut-Biron won by Frontal - himself fourth in the previous season's Prix du Jockey Club. On ground considered too soft for him, he was squeezed out of third by a head by Grandier who went on to win a Prix d'Ispahan and a Prix Ganay as well as finish third in a Prix de l'Arc de Triomphe. Nine days later, Wolver Hollow ventured into calmer waters when winning the Prix Ridgway from Right Honourable and Atopolis. After a scheduled run at Newbury was cancelled following the abandonment of the meeting, Wolver Hollow's next run was in the Queen Elizabeth II Stakes. The absences of 2000 Guineas third Jimmy Reppin and Irish Derby runner up Ribofilio notwithstanding, the field still featured Sussex Stakes runner up World Cup, Prix Jean Prat victor Lorenzaccio and Greenham Stakes winner Heathen. The race, ran on soft ground, was contested between World Cup and Wolver Hollow up the straight with the former eventually winning by four easy lengths with Lorenzaccio a further three lengths behind in third. Wolver Hollow's season would culminate once again in the Cambridgeshire Handicap, this time shouldering top weight of 9st 8lbs. Next in the weights was Diadem Stakes winner Secret Ray on 9st 6lbs, Jersey Stakes third Paddy Me on 9st 4lbs, the same weight as previous year's runner up Straight Master while Yorkshire Oaks winner Exchange, carrying 9st, was sent off favourite. Wolver Hollow ran a career best to finish second, going down by a neck to Emirilo despite conceding twenty-seven pounds.

1969: five-year-old season
Henry Cecil's first season as a racehorse trainer would be spearheaded by Wolver Hollow's final season as a racehorse. His reappearance came in the Mark Lane Jubilee Stakes, a ten furlong handicap over ten furlongs on very soft ground. There he faced a stiff task sitting on top of the handicap conceding upwards of seven pounds to winners of the Rosebery Stakes and the City and Suburban Handicap along with the previous year's winner. In the event, bottom weight Sovereign Ruler won by a facile eight lengths and would go on to win two and twice finish placed in valuable handicaps through the rest of the season. Wolver Hollow finished runner up while conceding thirty-five pounds to the well handicapped winner and was very much considered a contender going into the Lockinge Stakes on his next start. However, he would finish a tailed off last of six behind Habitat and subsequently underwent a dope test. Wolver Hollow's penultimate start came at Royal Ascot in the Prince of Wales's Stakes where he would be ridden by Lester Piggott for the first time. Here he faced four rivals in the shape of Noel Murless's top class Connaught, Epsom Derby also-ran Stoned and a couple of high class handicappers. Class told with Connaught making all to win by five lengths ahead of Wolver Hollow, with stoned a further two lengths behind in third. Wolver Hollow's career would be defined by his final start in the Eclipse Stakes where he would also be the last horse to carry his owner's colours. Coughing forced Connaught and Ribofilio (Irish Derby second) to miss their engagement while the useful Remand was withdrawn leaving seven runners to face the starter at Sandown. High class continental form was well represented with Light Wind, who had won that season's Premio Presidente della Repubblica, Hogarth who won the 1968 Derby Italiano and Timmy My Boy who finished runner up in that year's Prix du Jockey Club. Royal Rocket was third in the Coronation Stakes while sole three year old runner Rocked finished third in the Greenham Stakes. Park Top, bidding to become the first mare to win in the race's history, came into the race three from three for the season collecting the Prix de la Seine, the Coronation Cup and the Hardwicke Stakes along the way. Waiting tactics were typically employed on Park Top and controversially, this would be her undoing in the race. As described in Timeform's Racehorses of 1969 "Wolver Hollow turned for home behind Park Top, came up the rails, gradually made his way to the front after an uninterrupted run, and led throughout the last furlong to win comfortably. Park Top, on the other hand, had several positions in the straight. She ran into the heels of the pacemaking Rocked two furlongs out, and after making her way round that horse she found her way blocked by the Italian Derby winner Hogarth. By the time she had moved out to come round Hogarth on the wide outside she had no chance of catching Wolver Hollow: she had used up most of her energy finding a way through, and courage wasn't enough to win her the prize." Park Top would win the King George VI and Queen Elizabeth Stakes next time under Lester Piggott, confirming that she was superior to her Sandown showing. Nevertheless, Wolver Hollow's win was enough to secure a new career as a stallion.

Races

Stud career
When owner Hope Goddard Iselin retired at the age of 102, the horses she still had in training were sent to be sold at Newmarket. The one exception was Wolver Hollow who was given to his former trainer Cecil Boyd-Rochfort. On Wolver Hollow's retirement, he was syndicated by the Curragh Bloodstock Agency and initially stood at Athgarvan Stud, The Curragh. Through a friendship between Boyd-Rochfort and Billy Iceton, Wolver Hollow spent his latter breeding career at Tara Stud in County Meath. Wolver Hollow enjoyed success with his first crop, spearheaded by the classic winning Furry Glen. His greatest achievement as a stallion came in 1976 when the Henry Cecil trained Wollow won five top class races, enabling his sire to become the leading sire in the UK and Ireland. Wollow's contribution to this achievement can not be understated. Wolver Hollow earned his accolade with a record of 34 wins from 18 horses amassing £192,362 in prize money - £166,389 of which was won by Wollow. Indeed, Wollow's earnings were such that they eclipsed the £166,323 earned by the progeny of Vaguely Noble, that season's second leading sire. Unsurprisingly, this would represent the zenith of Wolver Hollow's stallion career and while he would produce a further handful of useful horses, none of them would win at the highest level.

As a damsire, Wolver Hollow could not count any European Group One winners among his descendants although Love A Show was victorious in the 1983 Blue Diamond Stakes. Other horses of note include Reach, winner of the 1984 Royal Lodge Stakes, Festive Cheer, third in the 1991 Phoenix Stakes, Treasure Hope, winner of the 1992 Premio Regina Elena (Italian 1000 Guineas), and Wrapping, a runner up in the 1989 Oaks d'Italia. Wolver Hollow was also the damsire of several useful National Hunt horses such as Simply Dashing, a high class handicap chaser who finished second in a Charlie Hall Chase, 1992 Baring Bingham Novices' Hurdle winner Thetford Forest and useful handicapper Latent Talent.

He was euthanised due to deteriorating health on 13 June 1987.

Notable progeny

c = colt, f = filly, g = gelding

Pedigree

References

External links 
 1969 Eclipse Stakes (YouTube)

1964 racehorse births
1987 racehorse deaths
Racehorses bred in the United Kingdom
Thoroughbred family 19-b
British Champion Thoroughbred Sires
Racehorses trained in the United Kingdom